The 1998 ENKA Open was a tennis tournament played on outdoor hard courts in Istanbul in Turkey that was part of Tier IV of the 1998 WTA Tour. The tournament was held from August 3 through August 9, 1998.

Champions

Singles

 Henrieta Nagyová defeated  Olga Barabanschikova 6–4, 3–6, 7–6
 It was Nagyová's 2nd title of the year and the 5th of her career.

Doubles

 Meike Babel /  Laurence Courtois defeated  Åsa Carlsson /  Florencia Labat 6–0, 6–2
 It was Babel's only title of the year and the 1st of her career. It was Courtois' only title of the year and the 2nd of her career.

ENKA Open
ENKA Open
1998 in Turkish tennis